Paris by Night 52: Giã Từ Thế Kỷ is a Paris by Night program produced by Thúy Nga that was filmed at the Terrace Theater in Long Beach, California. The MCs were Nguyễn Ngọc Ngạn and Nguyễn Cao Kỳ Duyên. This show was released on VHS in 1999. On December 31, 2016, the show was uploaded in its entirety to the official Thúy Nga Productions YouTube channel.

Track listing 

Notes
 Rights to the songs "Khổ Vì Yêu Nàng", "Tình Tôi Mới Lớn", "Tiếc Thương", "Tình Là Gì?", "Ai Về Với Tôi", and "Năm 2000" belonged to Thúy Nga Productions from the time of release.

References

External links
 YouTube — Thúy Nga – Paris By Night 52 [Full Show]

Paris by Night